Tiraspoltransgas-Pridnestrovie (also referred as Tiraspoltransgas or Tiraspoltransgaz)  is the largest gas supplier in Transnistria, with headquarters in Tiraspol. It was established in 1993.

The majority shares of Tiraspoltransgas is probably controlled by Russia's Gazprom, although Gazprom has not confirmed the ownership officially.

Tiraspoltransgas handles an annual traffic of 23 to 24 billion cubic meters of Russian gas via Transnistria. This is sent to both the rest of Moldova and further west, to other countries in Europe. In addition, Transnistria itself consumes 1.2 to 1.3 billion cubic meters a year.

External links

Tiraspoltransgas, official site

Companies of Transnistria
Oil and gas companies of Moldova
1993 establishments in Moldova
Energy companies established in 1993